Astro Xi Yue HD  was a free TV channel for NJOI and Astro's pay and free subscription platforms. The channel was launched during Chinese New Year on 1 February 2015. It broadcast previous programming such as dramas, movies, documentaries, music and variety shows from sister channel. The last day of broadcast was at 30 June 2019, iQIYI will begin its broadcast starting from 17 July 2019. All overseas live event will be aired through Astro Channel 338.

References
Official Website of Astro Xi Yue HD

Astro Malaysia Holdings television channels
Television channels and stations established in 2015
Television channels and stations disestablished in 2019
2015 establishments in Malaysia
2019 disestablishments in Malaysia